The Heinrich Mann Prize is an essay prize that has been awarded since 1953, first by the East German Academy of Arts, then by the Academy of Arts, Berlin. The prize, which comes with a €10,000 purse, is given annually on 27 March, Heinrich Mann's day of birth. The laureate is selected by an independent three-member jury which usually includes the previous year's laureate.

Recipients

1953: Stefan Heym, Wolfgang Harich, Max Zimmering
1954: Gotthold Gloger, Theo Harych 
1955: – 
1956: Franz Fühmann, Rudolf Fischer, Wolfgang Schreyer
1957: Hanns Maaßen, Herbert Nachbar, Margarete Neumann
1958: Hans Grundig, Herbert Jobst, Rosemarie Schuder
1959: Heiner Müller, Hans Lorbeer, Inge Müller
1960: Helmut Hauptmann, Annemarie Reinhard 
1961: Dieter Noll 
1962: Günter Kunert, Bernhard Seeger  
1963: Christa Wolf
1964: Günter de Bruyn
1965: Johannes Bobrowski, Brigitte Reimann 
1966: Peter Weiss 
1967: Hermann Kant, Walter Kaufmann  
1968: Herbert Ihering 
1969: Werner Heiduczek, Wolfgang Joho, Alfred Wellm 
1970: Fritz Selbmann, Jeanne Stern, Kurt Stern, Martin Viertel  
1971: Jurek Becker, Erik Neutsch, Herbert Otto 
1972: Karl-Heinz Jakobs, Fred Wander  
1973: Ulrich Plenzdorf, Helga Schütz
1974: Kurt Batt, Gerhard Wolf 
1975: Irmtraud Morgner, Eberhard Panitz  
1976: Annemarie Auer, Siegfried Pitschmann 
1977: Erich Köhler, Joachim Nowotny 
1978: Karl Mickel 
1979: Fritz Rudolf Fries 
1980: Volker Braun, Paul Gratzik  
1981: Peter Hacks 
1982: Christoph Hein, Werner Liersch
1983: Friedrich Dieckmann, Helmut H. Schulz 
1984: Heinz Czechowski 
1985: Helga Königsdorf, Bernd Leistner 
1986: Helga Schubert, Heidi Urban de Jauregui 
1987: Luise Rinser 
1988: Fritz Mierau 
1989: Wulf Kirsten 
1990: Adolf Endler, Elke Erb  
1991: Peter Gosse, Kito Lorenc 
1992: – 
1993/94 Lothar Baier 
1995: Hans Mayer 
1996: Julius Posener 
1997: Michael Rutschky 
1998: Karl Markus Michel 
1999: Katharina Rutschky 
2000: Dubravka Ugrešić 
2001: Walter Boehlich
2002: Götz Aly
2003: Wolfgang Schivelbusch
2004: Claudia Schmölders
2005: Ivan Nagel
2006: Peter von Matt
2007: Karl Heinz Bohrer
2008: Heinz Schlaffer
2009: Hanns Zischler
2010: Michael Maar
2011: Marie-Luise Scherer
2012: Uwe Kolbe
2013: Robert Menasse
2014: Robert Schindel
2015: Adam Zagajewski
2016: Gunnar Decker
2017: Gisela von Wysocki
2018: Christian Bommarius
2019: Danilo Scholz
2020: Eva Horn
2021: Kathrin Passig
2022: Lothar Müller

References

External links

See also
 German literature
 List of literary awards
 List of poetry awards
 List of years in literature
 List of years in poetry

Mann, Heinrich